Captain Martin Walker is the protagonist and player character of the 2012 third-person shooter video game Spec Ops: The Line, the tenth entry of the Spec Ops series, developed by German studio Yager Development and published by 2K Games. Walker is a member of Delta Force, a special operations force of the United States Army. During the events of The Line, Walker is tasked with leading a team on a recon mission to a disaster-ravaged Dubai. Sometime after his arrival in Dubai, Walker decides to search for his former superior, Lieutenant Colonel John Konrad, who is last known to be leading the city's evacuation and relief efforts. He begins committing unethical acts of violence against other survivors in the city, and experience hallucinations which distorts the game's subsequent events.

Walker is designed to be the protagonist of a video game experience which challenges the player emotionally through its exploration of discomforting themes associated with the efficacies and consequences of war on its combatants. Lead writer Walt Williams was largely responsible for Walker's characterization, which underwent changes in tandem with the revisions to the story of The Line during its development. Williams eventually decided that Walker's sanity gradually deteriorates as the story progresses. He believed that this provides greater narrative depth as Walker's experiences explore the extent of a soldier’s humanity and the impact of his psyche from the difficult choices he has to make. 

Voiced by American actor Nolan North, Walker is noted by critics for standing out among protagonist characters in the video game industry, as The Line focuses on exploring the implications of the player's actions directing Walker's decisions as part of the game's story. The character's motivations have been widely discussed by commentators, who explore and analyze the series' underlying themes in various publications and academic writings.

Concept and design
In an interview with GamesRadar, lead writer Walt Williams explained that the development team of Spec Ops: The Line desired to do a "dramatic, more raw war story", something that no other entity in the video game industry was attempting at the time. The story arc of its protagonist, Captain Martin Walker, is written to subvert the military shooter genre in a number of ways. In particular, it undermines the notion that intervention from the United States military is based on virtue; challenges the portrayal of war in popular media which is often inconspicuously devoid of civilian casualties; highlights the traumatic effect of war on surviving soldiers; and exposes the ambiguities between battlefield friends and enemies.  

The character's surname Walker was chosen because he would end up traversing much of the game's levels by foot. Walker is initially presented with a personality that evokes a virtuous military serviceman archetype: clean cut, courteous to his colleagues, and respectful of the rules of military engagement. The writing for the camaraderie between Walker and his squad mates was inspired by HBO's Generation Kill. As every motivation Walker has in the game is designed to mirror the motivation of someone who plays a video game, his emotional state is often explicitly reflected to the player. Because the player and Walker is intended to be the same person according to the game's design philosophy, the character is presented as an "average guy" who is relatable to the player in spite of his special forces training background. Much of his personality is expressed through his body language and his reactions during battle sequences. Lead designer Cory Davis described the team's attempt behind such a characterization to be "tough", as they wanted to express as strongly as possible how Walker would evolve from a "blank canvas" to a psychologically damaged person after experiencing some calamitous events within the story. Walker’s appearance and demeanor grows more ragged or unhinged the closer he gets to his target and is indicative of the toll it has taken on his sanity following hours of intense firefights. The 1990 film Jacob's Ladder provides a reference point in characterizing Walker's post-war traumatic experience. 

Williams characterized Walker's main flaw to be his inability or unwillingness to cut his losses and let go of his mission even though it is doomed to fail. Instead, Walker would double down on his hunt for Colonel John Konrad, Walker's former superior during their time serving in Afghanistan, and is adamant in his belief that the risk surrounding his attempt to apprehend the person supposedly for Dubai's disastrous conditions will eventually pay off. Walker uses lethal force not because he wants to defeat Konrad, but because he is determined to convince himself that he is the hero of the story; his desire to be a "good man" and his misguided conviction that every bullet he fires makes the world a better place instead results in further ruin and senseless loss of life around him. In his book Significant Zero: Heroes, Villains, and the Fight for Art and Soul in Video Games, Williams revealed that Walker was originally supposed to pursue a still-living Konrad to the top floor of Dubai's tallest skyscraper. This follows an extended period of time where Konrad serves as a major presence by antagonizing Walker via radio broadcasts throughout the story. At one point during the development of The Line, Williams decided to reframe the story. He introduced a plot twist which takes place by the end of The Line, which reveals that Konrad was already dead prior to the arrival of Walker's squad in Dubai and that he was hallucinating Konrad's messages to him the entire time. 

According to Williams, much of the game's events are intentionally left open to interpretation. From his point of view, Walker died in a helicopter crash at the end of the game's prologue and that the entirety of its narrative afterwards exists in a state of purgatory, hallucinated by Walker as he lay dying in the wreckage. The prologue sequence itself, which begins in medias res with a helicopter chase involving Walker's squad, was mandated by senior management overseeing the development team. In response, Williams decided to discreetly alter the context of the game's story by asking the characters' voice actors to re-record a few alternate lines for the sequence, which shows Walker experiencing a déjà vu  moment later in the story. Williams explained that Walker's unstable psychological state is due in part to his denial over the atrocities he unwittingly committed against innocent civilians earlier in the narrative.

Portrayal

Nolan North was chosen to voice Walker. To North, "a good story starts with a good script" and that he would only consider improvising or deviating from the script whenever he is convinced that the improvisation is objectively an improvement over the pre-determined material. For his performance, North mostly adhered to the script for The Line as he found it to be consistently well written with an engaging story. However, North was unaware that he was directed to make a déjà vu reference when he was asked by Williams to re-record the lines for the helicopter sequence. North is personally acquainted with career military people and noted in interviews that the role is not an unusual one for him. In the beginning, he was given a description of Walker's backstory, which included details explaining who he is, where he comes from and where he grew up. To North, The Line possesses a hidden depth that is uncommon within the shooter game genre. For example, Walker's backstory humanizes him as he is essentially a man in a uniform, who would have otherwise led a typical civilian life if he is not serving in the military like many real-life military servicemen. 

Nolan described The Line as "one of the most psychologically thrilling games" he had been involved with, because it is focused on the psyche of the soldier in combat and how they could be affected by their circumstances. North explained that with Walker, players are actually "walking in his mind" as opposed to walking in his shoes. This connects players with Walker at an emotional level that very few shooter games will reach in North's opinion, as soldier characters are often portrayed in an overly simplistic manner as individuals who are seemingly invincible physically and mentally. North explained that Walker is "a soldier, through and through, but he’s also just a man", and that ultimately he just needed to put as much of himself into the character in order to prepare for his role.

Fictional biography

Captain Martin Walker is a Delta Force operator who leads a three-man squad consisting of himself, First Lieutenant Alphonso Adams, and Staff Sergeant John Lugo to undertake what initially appears to be a recon mission, designed to reconnect with the 33rd Infantry Battalion of the United States Army who are trapped in a sandstorm-ravaged Dubai. Shortly after their arrival in Dubai, Walker and his squad would encounter a series of conflicts between insurgents instigated by CIA agents and the remnants of the 33rd. After coming across refugees being rounded up by the 33rd, the team intervenes, but the 33rd soldiers mistake them for CIA operatives and begin a firefight. Walker then elects to disobey standing orders and find Konrad, the last known leader of the 33rd, on his own accord. Walker's squad soon find themselves embroiled in a conspiracy by CIA agents active in Dubai, who manipulate Walker into furthering their goals.

A pivotal moment which occurs halfway through the game's narrative marks the tipping point of Walker's descent into madness and implicates him in the killing of civilians through the deliberate use of chemical weapons at a heavily fortified location called the Gate. Walker leads the squad to assault the Gate and continue the efforts of Gould, a CIA agent who had earlier aided the squad but is captured and killed by the 33rd. Determined to break the 33rd's hold on the Gate, Walker ordered the deployment of a mortar that fires white phosphorus, even though he is fully aware of the consequences of its destructive capability. When challenged by Lugo, Walker insists that they do not have a choice; this is reinforced by the game's structure as it is impossible to progress the story without using the white phosphorus. After the mortar is fired and the Gate's defenses are breached, Walker's squad walk through the carnage they have caused, and discover that civilians that were taken from the Nest have also burned to death alongside the 33rd soldiers who were defending them. A cutscene depicting a tense confrontation between Walker and his squadmates ensues, as his suitability for leadership as well as the validity of their military action are questioned. Walker rationalizes that Konrad and the 33rd forced his hand and vows vengeance over the incident.

Walker begins hallucinating radio communications from Konrad after he acquires a small radio from a room where the squad discovers Konrad's executed command team. Walker also undergoes a change of personality as he continues to push forward in his fight against the 33rd, changing from his friendly wise-cracking banter with his squadmates and professionally measured engagement with enemies to rage-driven acts of killing, which he openly celebrates as if he is provided with an adrenaline rush. Walker's squad eventually encounters another CIA agent named Riggs, who directs them into assisting his sabotage of the city's key infrastructure to wipe out the remaining population of Dubai, with the goal of covering up the 33rd's prior atrocities and protect the United States' international reputation. Realizing what they had done, Walker leads the squad to a radio tower to broadcast their intention to evacuate the city. The squad is attacked shortly after they leave the building by commandeering a Black Hawk helicopter, which crashed following a brief firefight.

Walker and his squad survive the crash, but he loses Lugo to a civilian lynch mob, and later Adams to a contingent of the 33rd outside a tower in downtown Dubai where Konrad's penthouse is located. Upon his arrival inside Konrad's penthouse to confront his former superior, Walker realizes that Konrad is long dead after a suicide, and is instead confronted by a hallucination of Konrad, who tells Walker that he is responsible for the horrific consequences of his own actions since his arrival in Dubai. Walker's ultimate fate is decided by the player; Walker may commit suicide during his descent into psychological turmoil, or he may regain his senses and delivers a request for evacuation of Dubai using Konrad's radio. In the event of the latter, the player may further decide Walker's actions and fate during the post-credits epilogue, when a convoy of Army rescue Humvees encounter Walker.

Reception and analysis
 

As the player character of Spec Ops: The Line, Captain Martin Walker has been the subject of extensive discussion by critics, with regards to how video games address and define player agency. Writing for the 2017 publication 100 Greatest Video Game Characters, Nick Robinson noted that through the actions that the player has to undertake in the game and Walker's deterioration physically and mentally as a consequence of the player's actions, his character "forces reflection" on the notion of a video game about war as well as its players who "play war". Robinson emphasized the fact that Walker is represented in third-person in The Line, unlike many video protagonists within the shooter game genre, which explicitly presents the player with the deterioration of Walker's moral judgment and emotional state, not only though his increasing mental instability but also through the physical scarring of his body. Brendan Keogh described Walker's character development as a "character study of the average videogame protagonist coming to terms with the messed up things we players make them do", a feature that is "completely absent from the majority of videogame stories" and The Line most important achievement. 

In an article written for PopMatters, G. Christopher Williams offered a less enthusiastic view of the creative direction behind Walker's story arc and opined that the set-up of the game's "win-state" that culminates in an inevitable loss is a "tragedy". Williams explained that The Line essentially "reverses" the plot of Heart of Darkness, a major inspiration of The Line, and that Walker’s character development differs from most other video game characters as it is far from positive and does not lead players on a journey  to a emotional state of mind where they would feel "empowered, practiced, and competent". He argued that it leads to "an effort that has to be endured because the end seems as if it is almost in sight", and that "psychic suicide feels warranted" for Walker after what he has done as controlled by the player over the course of The Line. Writing for the New York Times, Chris Suellentrop criticized the game's heavy-handed handling of its dark themes and the lack of subtlety with the way it presents Walker’s obtuseness regarding the horrific consequences of his actions.

Critical analyses of Walker's story arc have appeared in multiple peer-reviewed published journals. Henrik Andergard analyzed Walker's role in the narrative of The Line in his discussion of the concept of a traditional hero-narrative as well as the essential elements of the hero-character archetype. He concluded that Walker is a "conscious subversion of the modern military hero-narrative", and that the developers initially sets up expectations of The Line adhering to the genre and theme, which is later flaunted and actively criticized through Walker's failure to live up to that role. Toby Smethurst was fascinated by the premise of The Line, which involves the player in the interactive perpetration of atrocities through a gradual process of coming to empathize with Walker. He observed that even though The Line seemingly "punishes the player for playing it" by holding up their actions as an example of their complicity in violent content within video games, it remains compelling "in spite of, or perhaps because of its attitude towards videogame violence". He argued that The Line showed that the videogame medium has the potential to radically alter its players' relationship with "controversial memories of perpetration" by demonstrating the extent to which a strong empathic link between the player and its protagonist is possible, which provides a reasonable contrast against the direction most memory studies tend to adopt by universalizing the innocent’s perspective in the wake of violent conflict. 

Walker has appeared in multiple "top" character lists. IGN staff included Walker in their list of the best new video game characters of 2012. Geoff Thiew from Hardcore Gamer ranked Walker among a 2014 list of the most memorable soldier characters in video games, citing the exploration of his struggle with post-traumatic stress disorder and his story conveys a potent message about the veneration of warfare by popular media. Ron Whitaker discussed Walker's significance as a notable video game protagonist in a 2015 list published by The Escapist.

Walker is often cited as one of the most notable roles of Nolan North, a prolific voice actor in the video game industry. In an essay written for Grantland, Tom Bissell opined that The Line is about "Nathan Drake going insane", which alludes to one of North's best known characters and the quality both Walker and Drake share as a "playable everyman character" archetype. Keogh took a different view and argued that The Line delivers its critique of shooter games by suggesting that video game protagonists like Drake and Walker are sociopaths because of what they do in their games as directed by the player.

References

Further reading

External links 

Fictional captains
Fictional characters with post-traumatic stress disorder
Fictional mass murderers
Fictional military personnel in video games
Fictional soldiers in video games
Fictional United States Army Delta Force personnel
Fictional war veterans
Male video game villains
Video game characters introduced in 2012
Video game protagonists